Brithodes is a monotypic moth genus of the family Erebidae. Its only species, Brithodes quadrilineata, is known from New Guinea. Both the genus and the species were first described by George Thomas Bethune-Baker in 1908.

References

Hypeninae
Monotypic moth genera